is a Japanese manga series written and illustrated by Karino Takatsu. It was serialized by Square Enix in Zōkan Young Gangan (2007–2010), Zōkan Young Gangan Big (2011) and Monthly Big Gangan (2011–2014), with its chapters collected in four tankōbon volumes. A 13-episode anime television series adaptation by A-1 Pictures was broadcast from July to September 2013.

Plot
The story revolves around the daily lives of civil servants in a government office building in the fictional city of Mitsuba, Hokkaido. Lucy's parents had a very hard time picking a single name for her when she was born. Because of their indecisiveness, they decided to give her over a dozen different names, and this was legally approved by a civil servant no less. At an adult age, Lucy manages to land a job at the same public service office. But her reason is to seek revenge against the person who had legalized her ridiculously long name. Being a civil servant is not an easy job due to dealing with many angry citizens, facing different challenges, and having to put up with wacky co-workers each day. However, Lucy is determined to do whatever it will take to get her revenge. Newcomers Hasebe Yutaka, Yamagami, Miyoshi Saya, and their supervisor Ichimiya Taishi go through the everyday quirks of working at their office.

Characters

Main characters

Lucy is a newcomer who decides to apply as a public servant to look for and take revenge on the man (himself a public servant) responsible for approving her rather long name given to her by her parents. She shows seriousness in her work, but is always the target of Yutaka's pranks. Her real name, or least part of the name she could mention, is Lucy Kimiko Akie Airi Shiori Rinne Yoshiho Chihoko Ayano Fumika Chitose Sanae Mikiko Ichika Yukino Reina Eri ... (still continues).
 She has a cowlick (ahoge) sticking up on her head—a trait inherited from her mother, according to the flashback in the first episode—which reacts according to her mood or emotions. Out of all the three new employees, she seems to be the most naïve and low guarded. She dislikes Hasebe at first because of his constant teasing of her, but throughout the story, she begins to notice his feelings towards her. In the final episode, when Hasebe asked her out, she says "not yet", which implies that she is now more conscious of him and may have developed feelings towards him too.

The only male among the three newcomers, who is notorious for goofing off at work, asking for the email addresses of any girl he meets which he never uses to contact them, and teasing Lucy. Despite his easy-going slacker image, he in fact shows some talent in his line of duty in the least expected situations, like in episode 3, when he is seen to be able to do ventriloquism and use sign language. At home he is not as hyper as he is in the office due to always tiring himself out playing computer games. He has a sister named Kaoru, who is also a civil servant, and is even more rambunctious than Hasebe is. Among his family he is actually the least hyper. He seems to have feelings for Lucy and has asked her out twice, only to be "shot down" both times. It was unclear whether he was serious in the beginning but, in episode 8, it is confirmed that Hasebe has feelings for Lucy when he says to her "I was pretty serious all this time, but at this rate, I'll really fall deep in love with you". In episode 12, Hasebe and Lucy have their first date but is unable to finish it due to Hasebe's family circumstances. At the end of the episode, it is revealed that Hasebe's father is the public servant who approved Lucy's long name.

A 24-year-old college graduate and a soft-spoken girl who tends to keep her opinions of other people to herself. She was first assigned as one of many front desk officers, and spends most of her time listening to the never-ending rants of their older customers, especially the elderly Mrs. Tanaka. She develops an awkward relationship with Mrs. Tanaka's grandson Jōji, whom she feels infiltrated by his habit of carrying her for nonsense, though she has developed a better feeling to him.

A social service employee who is actually working as a temporary employee with a shorter shift than others. She is rather aloof towards her co-workers, and is revealed to be an avid fan of the magical girl series Magical Flowers. When she is not at work, she attends cosplay events dressed as Gerbera Pink, one of the characters of the series. She openly desires to see Lucy cosplay as one of the other characters from "Magical Flowers" due to her dark hair and large bust. She hates Hasebe getting too close to Lucy in case he convinces her to cosplay before she does. She has been dating Ichimiya for over a year, and has tried to make it clear to him that she doesn't care if he prioritizes Tohko on Christmas because of comiket.

Taishi is a supervisor in the health and welfare office and the one in charge of Lucy and her friends. Although kind and approachable, Taishi is prone to be bossed around, particularly by his sister. He has been dating Chihaya for over a year, but worries about getting dumped before Christmas, since Toko's birthday is on the same day and he always prioritizes Toko, though Chihaya, due to her own Christmas cosplay commitments, doesn't seem to care.

The Section Chief of the Health and Welfare Department. He is first introduced as a talking stuffed rabbit in episode 4 due to his extreme shyness. He sometimes falls prey, though, to the mood of his subordinates--and is either stomped on or has the fur plucked off of him like petals on a flower as a result. He is also an old friend of Hasebe's father.

 

Taishi's tsundere younger sister, noted for having a peculiar marking under her right eye similar to the "bulging vein" image used to depict a person when angry. Staying true to this quirky trait, Tōhko is often in a bad mood and has a short temper. On the other hand, she seems to have a brother complex. Ever since learning about her older brother's interest in working as a public servant, Tōhko started learning more about the job, and by high school is knowledgeable enough to give surprise quizzes to employees every time she visits her brother's workplace. Her birthday is on Christmas Eve.

Minor characters

An old lady living in the ward who frequents the office to visit Miyoshi. She always talks about her daughter-in-law and has a grandson who happens to be Yutaka's childhood friend and rival. Although she tried to get Miyoshi to marry her grandson, she stops talking about him when she realizes that Miyoshi hates him.

Tanaka-san's grandson. He is a 22-year-old single banker. As Yutaka's childhood friend, he never beats Yutaka in anything, leading to a very awkward friendship. It also seems that he might have unrequited feelings towards Yutaka as indicated by Chihaya.

Yutaka's sister. She likes to play pranks on people, such as on Lucy when she spent the night at her house after an office dinner rendered her too drunk. As she realizes that Yutaka one-sidedly loves Lucy, she tries to set them up so that Lucy will fall in love with Yutaka.

Kenzo Momoi's daughter and also Touko's high school friend. She is cute looking and looks like her father. She doesn't seem to be bothered by her dad's outer appearance and always covers up for him. She is also smart and understands situations very well. Although she discovers Taishi and Chihaya were dating, she tries to keep a straight face when Tōko finds out.

 Lucy's parents. Due to them asking other people's opinions for the name of their daughter and not being able to decide which one to use, they named their daughter using all those names.

Yutaka and Kaoru's dad who worked as a ward office staff member when Lucy was born. He approved the application for Lucy's ridiculous long name, and is the target of Lucy's revenge. He is also an old friend of the Section Chief.

Media

Manga
Servant × Service is written and illustrated by Karino Takatsu. The series began in the Square Enix's Young Gangans spin-off magazine Zōkan Young Gangan on June 29, 2007. It was published until October 2010, and then, the magazine changed its name to Zōkan Young Gangan Big, where the series was published from April to August 2011. The magazine began as a standalone one, titled Monthly Big Gangan on October 25, 2011, where the series was published until June 25, 2014. Square Enix collected its chapters in four tankōbon volumes, released from September 24, 2011 to August 25, 2014.<ref></p></p></p></ref>

It has been released in the United States by Yen Press in 2015 digitally (in four single volumes) and in 2016 physically (in two omnibus volumes).

Anime
A 13-episode anime adaptation produced by A-1 Pictures and directed by Yasutaka Yamamoto began airing on ABC on July 5, 2013 and were later aired on Tokyo MX, Tochigi TV, Gunma TV, Hokkaido Broadcasting Company, Chukyo TV, BS11 and AT-X. In addition the series uses character designs done by Terumi Nishii based on the original designs by Karino Takatsu, while the series composition and script are done by Kento Shimoyama, along with sound direction by Akiko Fujita and music by monaca. Aniplex of America had obtained licensing rights to the series for home video release, while Crunchyroll had obtained the series for streaming in select parts of the world.

Episode list

Reception
Jacob Chapman of Anime News Network reviewed the complete anime series in 2014, giving it an overall C+ rating. He was critical of the unfunny comedy and slow pacing of its consequence-free storylines resulting in the show being "boring and pointless" at various points, but was commendable towards the female cast having "enough personality" and cuteness during their relationships to give viewers a "benign and charming" experience and gave credit to the humor for not being obnoxious and "a little ambitious for a gag strip" adaptation, concluding that: "It's never a regrettable viewing experience, but it's got forgettable stored up in bulk." Nicoletta Christina Browne, writing for THEM Anime Reviews, felt the series lacked enough witticism and over-the-top characters to deliver its "tentative humor" and go beyond the "mundane nature of its setting", concluding that: "I really wanted to like this show, but it's honestly a bit boring. Your mileage may vary depending on your taste in comedy, but in my opinion it's badly hurt by its own tentativeness."

References

External links
  
 

A-1 Pictures
Anime series based on manga
Anime and manga set in Hokkaido
Aniplex
Comedy anime and manga
Gangan Comics manga
Seinen manga
Slice of life anime and manga
Square Enix franchises
Tokyo MX original programming
Yen Press titles
Yonkoma